Broken Bow may refer to:

In geography:

 Broken Bow, Nebraska, United States
 Broken Bow, Oklahoma, United States
 Broken Bow Lake, a man-made lake in southeast Oklahoma
 Broken Bow Township, Custer County, Nebraska, United States

In other fields:

 "Broken Bow" (Enterprise episode), the pilot episode of the television series Star Trek: Enterprise
Broken Bow (novel), the novelization of the above Star Trek episode
 Broken Bow Memorial Stadium, the home of the Broken Bow Savages
 Broken Bow Records, a country music record label
 Broken Bow High School (disambiguation)